Jean Maurice Jules Cabut (13 January 19387 January 2015), known by the pen-name Cabu, was a French comic strip artist and caricaturist. He was murdered in the January 2015 shooting attack on the Charlie Hebdo newspaper offices. Cabu was a staff cartoonist and shareholder at Charlie Hebdo.

Career
Cabu started out studying art at the École Estienne in Paris and his drawings were first published by 1954 in a local newspaper. The Algerian War forced him to be conscripted in the army for over two years, where his talent was used in the army magazine Bled and in Paris Match. His time in the army caused him to become a strident anti-militarist and adopt a slightly anarchistic view of society.

In 1960, after he left the Army, he became one of the founders of Hara-Kiri magazine. In the 1970s and 1980s, he became a popular artist, collaborating for a time with the children's TV programme Récré A2. He continued working in political caricature for Charlie Hebdo and Le Canard enchaîné.

His popular characters include Le Grand Duduche and adjudant Kronenbourg, and especially Mon Beauf. So spot-on was this caricature of an average, racist, sexist, vulgar, ordinary Frenchman that the word 'beauf' (short for "beau-frère", i. e., brother-in-law) has slipped into ordinary use. A 1973 drawing by Cabu attacking male politicians with the question "Qui a engrossé les 343 salopes du manifeste sur l'avortement?".("Who got the 343 sluts from the abortion manifesto pregnant?") gave the Manifesto of the 343 its familiar nickname, often mistaken as the original title.

In February 2006, a Cabu cartoon which appeared on the cover of Charlie Hebdo in response to the Danish cartoons affair caused more controversy and a lawsuit. It depicted the Muslim prophet Muhammad under the caption "Muhammad overwhelmed by fundamentalists", crying "C'est dur d'être aimé par des cons!" ("So hard to be loved by jerks!").

From September 2006 to January 2007, an exhibition entitled Cabu and Paris was organised at the Paris city hall.

Death
Cabu was killed, along with seven of his colleagues, two police officers, and two others, on 7 January 2015 in the Charlie Hebdo shooting when al-Qaeda gunmen stormed the newspaper's offices in Paris.

The asteroid 320880 Cabu was named in his memory on 5 June 2016 by its discoverer Jean-Claude Merlin.

Personal life
Cabu was the father of the French singer/songwriter Mano Solo (24 April 1963 – 10 January 2010).

He was succeeded by two unnamed relatives. His tombstone read... "the man who gave every moment a shot..." in Occitan.

Works

Le grand Duduche series :
 Le grand Duduche (1972) Dargaud
 Il lui faudrait une bonne guerre !.. (1972) Dargaud
 Les aventures de madame Pompidou (1972) Square
 L'ennemi intérieur (1973) éd. du Square et Dargaud
 Le grand Duduche en vacances (1974) éd. du Square
 Passe ton bac, après on verra ! (1980) éd. du Rond Point
 Maraboud'ficelle, scénario de William Leymergie (1980) Dargaud
 À bas la mode ! (1981) Dargaud
 Le Grand Duduche et la fille du proviseur (1982) Dargaud
Le journal de Catherine (1970) – éd du Square
Mon beauf (1976) éd du Square
Catherine saute au Paf (1978) éd du Square
Inspecteur la bavure (1981) Albin Michel
Le Gros blond avec sa chemise noire (1988) Albin Michel
À consommer avec modération (1989) Albin Michel
Mort aux vieux ! (1989) Albin Michel
Cabu au Canard Enchaîné (1989) Albin Michel
Tonton la-terreur (1991) Albin Michel
Adieu Tonton (1992) Albin Michel
Les Abrutis sont parmi nous (1992) Albin Michel
Responsables mais pas coupables ! (1993) Albin Michel
Secrets d'État (1994) Albin Michel
Les Aventure épatantes de Jacques Chirac (1996) Albin Michel
Vas-y Jospin ! (1999) Albin Michel
À gauche toute ! (2000) Albin Michel

See also
List of journalists killed in Europe

References

1938 births
2015 deaths
Assassinated French journalists
Charlie Hebdo people
Comic strip cartoonists
French editorial cartoonists
French Army personnel
French cartoonists
French comics artists
French caricaturists
French military personnel of the Algerian War
Journalists killed in France
People from Châlons-en-Champagne
Terrorism deaths in France
Victims of the Charlie Hebdo shooting
20th-century French journalists
21st-century French journalists